Nicholas Watson may refer to:

Nicholas Watson (academic), English-Canadian medievalist
Nicholas Watson, American writer and filmmaker